Chogha Bonut (Persian Choghā bonut) is an archaeological site in south-western Iran, located in the Khuzistan Province. 

The site is about 20km southeast of Dezful, and 5km west of Chogha Mish, another ancient site.

It is believed that the site was settled as early as 7200 BCE, making it the oldest lowland village in south-western Iran.

This settlement on the Susiana Plain played a big role in the early Elam civilization. Later, this area became dominated by Susa. The site is important because it preserves a record of preceramic period settlement in Iran.

Archaeology
The site has an area about 50 meters in diameter and about 5 meters in height. It was accidentally discovered in 1976 when the mound was being leveled for agribusiness development. Helene Kantor, then working at Chogha Mish nearby, hurried to the site and received a permit to investigate it.

Kantor remained for two seasons (1976/77 and 1977/78), but was unable to return in 1979 due to the Iranian Revolution. Abbas Alizadeh continued investigations at the site in 1996.  His findings were published in 2003. It is one of the few Neolithic sites excavated since the Iranian revolution.

Among the finds were 41 clay tokens.

Settlement
Five phases of occupation are documented at the site: 
 the Aceramic phase, 
 the Formative Ceramic phase, (Film Painted Ware)
 the Archaic Susiana 0 phase (includes the Early Susiana period, ca. 5900 BCE), 
 the Late Middle Susiana phase (ca. 5200 BCE)
 the Late Susiana 2 phase. (ca. 4400-4000 BCE)

See also
Prehistory of Iran
Cities of the ancient Near East

References 

Archaeological sites in Iran
Former populated places in Iran
Populated places established in the 8th millennium BC
History of Khuzestan Province
Buildings and structures in Khuzestan Province
Elam
Prehistoric Iran